TV5 was a Latvian television channel, created in June 1996. All programs were broadcast in Russian. The channel showed Russian serials, movies and hockey nightly news broadcast out of Arēna Rīga. Until October 2001 the name was TV Riga. TV5 was owned by Modern Times Group. Financial reasons forced TV5 to cease broadcast in March 2016.

History 
In June 1996, TV Riga started broadcasting. This channel broadcast took place in the Riga Radio and TV Tower. The broadcasting radius was 70 kilometers around Riga. In 1999, for a short period, the channel license was revoked because the National Radio and Television Council complained about channel activity, but in order to obtain the permission to broadcast the channel in March 2001, it resumed its activities.

On 1 October 2001 TV Riga changed its name and began to broadcast as TV5. Initially, TV Riga broadcast in Latvian and Russian, but with the renaming the Latvian ceased.

TV5 reached 80% of the Latvian territory. It was one of the Latvian television channels, who shot completely in Russian. Records were subtitled in Latvian, but live programming in Russian was not translated. This channel was also available on cable television and internet.

In March 2010, together with TV5, LNT acquired the Latvian company "Independent national media".

On 14 December 2010 at 14.00 the signal of TV5 via Astra 4A satellite, served by SES Astra, was paused. SES Astra explained it with the channel debts, but the channel management avoided giving any explanations.

On 9 January 2012, the channels TV5, LNT and Kanāls 2 became the owner of the Swedish media company Modern Times Group.

TV5 had extended periods of time worked at a significant loss and to reduce the channel LNT losses, it was decided that TV5 will be terminated for financial reasons on 31 March 2016.

References

External links 
  

Television channels in Latvia
Companies based in Riga
Television channels and stations established in 1996
Television channels and stations disestablished in 2016
Modern Times Group
1996 establishments in Latvia
Russian-language television stations
Russian-language mass media in Latvia